The 1983 Aragonese regional election was held on Sunday, 8 May 1983, to elect the 1st Cortes of the autonomous community of Aragon. All 66 seats in the Cortes were up for election. The election was held simultaneously with regional elections in twelve other autonomous communities and local elections all throughout Spain.

The Spanish Socialist Workers' Party (PSOE) came first in the election by winning exactly half the seats—33 out of 66—one short of an overall majority, with 46.8% of the vote. The People's Coalition, a coalition of centre-right parties comprising the People's Alliance (AP), the People's Democratic Party (PDP) and the Liberal Union (UL), came second with 18 seats and 22.6% of the share, while the Regionalist Aragonese Party (PAR) finished third with 20.5% and 13 seats. The Communist Party of Spain (PCE) and the Democratic and Social Centre (CDS) both obtained 1 seat with between 3–4% of the vote each. The former ruling party of Spain, the Union of the Democratic Centre (UCD), had dissolved itself in February 1983 and did not contest the election.

The PSOE had initially obtained 34 seats, the absolute majority, but a new count in Zaragoza following a number of claims resulted in the PSOE's 17th seat in the constituency being awarded to the People's Coalition by few votes. As a result of the election, PSOE candidate Santiago Marraco was elected by the Cortes as new president of the General Deputation of Aragon. The election remains the only occasion to date in which a party has obtained 50% or more of seats on its own in an Aragonese regional election.

Overview

Electoral system
The Cortes of Aragon were the devolved, unicameral legislature of the autonomous community of Aragon, having legislative power in regional matters as defined by the Spanish Constitution of 1978 and the regional Statute of Autonomy, as well as the ability to vote confidence in or withdraw it from a regional president.

Transitory Provisions First and Third of the Statute established a specific electoral procedure for the first election to the Cortes of Aragon, to be supplemented by the provisions within Royal Decree-Law 20/1977, of 18 March, and its related regulations. Voting for the Cortes was on the basis of universal suffrage, which comprised all nationals over 18 years of age, registered in Aragon and in full enjoyment of their civil and political rights. The 66 members of the Cortes of Aragon were elected using the D'Hondt method and a closed list proportional representation, with a threshold of three percent of valid votes—which included blank ballots—being applied regionally. Parties not reaching the threshold were not taken into consideration for seat distribution. Seats were allocated to constituencies, corresponding to the provinces of Huesca, Teruel and Zaragoza, with each being allocated a fixed number of seats: 18 for Huesca, 16 for Teruel and 32 for Zaragoza.

The use of the D'Hondt method might result in a higher effective threshold, depending on the district magnitude.

Election date
The General Deputation of Aragon was required to call an election to the Cortes of Aragon within from 1 February to 31 May 1983. On 7 March 1983, it was confirmed that the first election to the Cortes of Aragon would be held on Sunday, 8 May, together with regional elections for twelve other autonomous communities as well as nationwide local elections, with the election decree being published in the Official Gazette of Aragon on 10 March.

Background
Aragon had been granted a pre-autonomic regime in March 1978, resulting in the appointment of the first General Deputation of Aragon with Juan Antonio Bolea at its helm. After the approval of the Spanish Constitution of 1978, the process for negotiating and approving a statute of autonomy for Aragon was initiated in September 1979, after local councils—with the support of the Spanish Socialist Workers' Party (PSOE), the Regionalist Aragonese Party (PAR) and the Communist Party of Spain (PCE)—started applying to meet the requirements set down in Article 151 of the Constitution for the "fast-track" procedure for autonomy. Political conflict arose as the governing Union of the Democratic Centre (UCD), concerned that all regions could attempt to achieve maximum devolution within a short timeframe, ruled in January 1980 that all autonomic processes other than those of the Basque Country, Catalonia and Galicia were to be transacted under the "slow-track" procedure of Article 143; the difference between both procedures being the pace in the process of devolution.

The decision caused outcry among opposition parties and led to the application process bogging down, as some Aragonese local councils had applied for Article 151, others clinged on to the route of Article 143 and many others did not specify any preference, resulting in an insufficient support for either of the two constitutional procedures for autonomy. Similar complications arose in the Valencian Country and the Canary Islands, and parties agreed to hold talks to re-activate the autonomy process, leading to an inter-party agreement in May 1981—which was not joined by the PAR—in favour of the application of Article 143, as long as Aragon was guaranteed an autonomy equivalent to that provided for in Article 151 within five years, and in the drafting of a regional Statute.

Concurrently, the pre-autonomic General Deputation had seen a change in leadership in March 1981, when Juan Antonio Bolea was replaced by Gaspar Castellano. The former would end up leaving the party over disagreements with the regional government's policy both in the autonomic procedure to adopt—Bolea had been a staunch defender of Article 151's application from the beginning—and the so-called "Ebro mini-transfer" to Tarragona, opposed by Bolea. Further tensions within UCD over the electoral system to be established by the Statute led to an internal party crisis, which was aggravated after the split of former prime minister Adolfo Suárez's Democratic and Social Centre (CDS). The Statute would be finally approved on 10 August 1982, coming into force on 5 September. As a result of UCD securing a majority in the newly elected Provisional Assembly, its candidate Gaspar Castellano was re-elected, this time as the first president of the autonomous community of Aragon. After the UCD's collapse in the region in the 1982 general election, Castellano resigned as regional president, being replaced by Juan Antonio de Andrés, who maintained UCD's control over the regional government until the celebration of the May 1983 regional election.

Parliamentary composition
The composition of the Provisional Assembly was determined by the provisions of Transitory Provision Second of the Statute, which established that its members would be those designated by the various political parties based on a distribution which was to be made by applying the D'Hondt method to the provincial results obtained in the 1979 Spanish general election, to candidacies obtaining at least five percent of the valid votes cast in Aragon. As a result, the composition of the Provisional Assembly of Aragon, upon its constitution in September 1982, was established as indicated below:

Unlike what happened in other autonomous communities, the composition of the Aragonese regional assembly did not change as a result of the 1982 general election, despite efforts from the PAR for the Second Transitory Provision to be applied extensively to recalculate the seat distribution according to the most recent general election's results.

Parties and candidates
The electoral law allowed for parties and federations registered in the interior ministry, coalitions and groupings of electors to present lists of candidates. Parties and federations intending to form a coalition ahead of an election were required to inform the relevant Electoral Commission within fifteen days of the election call, whereas groupings of electors needed to secure the signature of at least one-thousandth of the electorate in the constituencies for which they sought election—with a compulsory minimum of 500 signatures—disallowing electors from signing for more than one list of candidates.

Below is a list of the main parties and electoral alliances which contested the election:

The electoral disaster of the Union of the Democratic Centre (UCD) in the October 1982 general election and the outcome of its extraordinary congress held in December, in which the party's leadership chose to transform the UCD into a christian democratic political force, brought the party to a process of virtual disintegration as many of its remaining members either switched party allegiances, split into new, independent candidacies or left politics altogether. Subsequent attempts to seek electoral allies ahead of the incoming 1983 local and regional elections, mainly the conservative People's Alliance (AP) and the christian democratic People's Democratic Party (PDP), had limited success due to concerns from both AP and UCD over such an alliance policy: AP strongly rejected any agreement that implied any sort of global coalition with UCD due to the party's ongoing decomposition, and prospects about a possible PDP–UCD merger did not come into fruition because of the latter's reluctance to dilute its brand within another party. By the time the UCD's executive had voted for the liquidation of the party's mounting debts and its subsequent dissolution on 18 February 1983, electoral alliances with the AP–PDP coalition had only been agreed in some provinces of the Basque Country and Galicia.

Together with AP, the PDP had agreed to maintain their general election alliance—now rebranded as the People's Coalition—for the May local and regional elections, with the inclusion of the Liberal Union (UL), a political party created in January 1983 out of independents from the AP–PDP coalition in an attempt to appeal to former UCD liberal voters. The Coalition had seen its numbers soar from late February as a result of many former members from the UCD's christian democratic wing joining the PDP.

Opinion polls
The tables below list opinion polling results in reverse chronological order, showing the most recent first and using the dates when the survey fieldwork was done, as opposed to the date of publication. Where the fieldwork dates are unknown, the date of publication is given instead. The highest percentage figure in each polling survey is displayed with its background shaded in the leading party's colour. If a tie ensues, this is applied to the figures with the highest percentages. The "Lead" column on the right shows the percentage-point difference between the parties with the highest percentages in a poll.

Voting preferences
The table below lists raw, unweighted voting preferences.

Results

Overall

Distribution by constituency

Aftermath
Under Article 22 of the Statute, investiture processes to elect the president of the General Deputation of Aragon required of an absolute majority—more than half the votes cast—to be obtained in the first ballot. If unsuccessful, a new ballot would be held 24 hours later requiring only of a simple majority—more affirmative than negative votes—to succeed. If the proposed candidate was not elected, successive proposals were to be transacted under the same procedure within ten-day periods. In the event of the investiture process failing to elect a regional president within a two-month period from the first ballot, the Cortes were to be automatically dissolved and a fresh election called, with elected deputies merely serving out what remained of their four-year terms.

On 27 May 1983, PSOE candidate Santiago Marraco was elected by the Cortes as new Aragonese president by an absolute majority of 35 out of 66, with support from both PCE and CDS and the abstention of the PAR.

After the constitution of the Cortes, on 22 June 1983, the Zaragoza Territorial Court issued a ruling in which it removed a seat in the province of Huesca from the AP-PDP-UL coalition and granted it to the PCE. In this way, the Communist Party of Spain was left with 2 seats in the Cortes of Aragon.

Notes

References
Opinion poll sources

Other

1983 in Aragon
Aragon
Regional elections in Aragon
May 1983 events in Europe